Ghiasabad (also Romanized as Ghīās̄ābād, Gheyāsābād, Gheyas̄ābād, Ghīāsābād, and Ghiyas Abad) is a village in Banadkuk Rural District, Nir District, Taft County, Yazd Province, Iran. At the 2006 census, its population was 47, in 24 families.

References 

Populated places in Taft County